National Ransom is the 2010 studio album by Elvis Costello. It was recorded in Nashville and Los Angeles with American songwriter and producer T Bone Burnett, and was released on 25 October 2010 (2 November in the US) on the Hear Music label. The album was received positively, earning a score of 79/100 on the review aggregate website Metacritic.

Featured musicians include Costello's recent backing bands The Imposters and The Sugarcanes, while the album also includes guest appearances by Vince Gill, Marc Ribot, Buddy Miller, Jim Lauderdale and Leon Russell.

The cover art is by Maakies creator Tony Millionaire.

Track listing

National Ransack EP
Originally a digital download was given away with orders for the album. The EP was later released separately on 10-inch vinyl.

Personnel
Dennis Crouch – double bass
 Davey Faragher – Fender Precision electric bass
 Pete Thomas – drums
 Marc Ribot – electric guitar, acoustic guitar, banjo
 Buddy Miller – harmony vocals
 Jerry Douglas – lap steel guitar
 Mike Compton – mandolin, harmony vocals
 Vince Gill – harmony vocals
 Jim Lauderdale – harmony vocals
 Steve Nieve – Vox Continental organ, Hammond organ, celesta
 T Bone Burnett – reverse piano, Gretsch Black Falcon electric guitar
 Jeff Taylor – piano, accordion
Stuart Duncan – electric violin, zither, electric viola
Dave Eggar – cello
Darrell Leonard – trumpet, flugelhorn
George Bohanon – trombone
Ira Nepus – trombone
Tom Peterson – baritone saxophone, bass clarinet
Maurice Spears – bass trombone
Andrew Duckles – viola
Matt Funes – viola
Caroline Campbell – violin
Lucia Micarelli – violin
Neel Hammond – violin
Radu Pieptea – violin
Bruce Dukov – violin, concertmaster
Mike Piersante – shaker
Elvis Costello – Gibson L-00 acoustic guitar, Fender Telecaster electric guitar, Ampeg AEB-1 bass guitar, reverse piano, Farfisa organ, lead vocals, harmony vocals, whistling

Charts

References

External links
 
 Nationalransom.com

2010 albums
Albums produced by Elvis Costello
Albums produced by T Bone Burnett
Elvis Costello albums